Fräulein Else (English: Miss Else) is a 1929 German silent drama film directed by Paul Czinner and starring Elisabeth Bergner, Albert Bassermann and Albert Steinrück. It was based on the 1924 novella of the same name by Arthur Schnitzler. Bergner had previously played her role on stage to great acclaim. However, it was felt that the film was hindered by being silent given the strength of the story's dialogue.

Partial cast 
 Elisabeth Bergner as Else Thalhof 
 Albert Bassermann as Dr. Alfred Thalhof 
 Albert Steinrück as Von Dorsday 
 Adele Sandrock as Tante Emma 
 Else Heller as Dr. Thalhofs Frau 
 Jack Trevor as Paul, Tante Emma's Sohn 
 Grit Hegesa as Cissy Mohr
 Irmgard Bern   
 Antonie Jaeckel   
 Gertrude De Lalsky   
 Paul Morgan
 Jaro Fürth   
 Carl Goetz   
 Alexander Murski   
 Ellen Plessow   
 Toni Tetzlaff

References

Bibliography
 Lorenz, Dagmar C. G. A Companion to the Works of Arthur Schnitzler. Camden House, 2003. 
 Prawer, S.S. Between Two Worlds: The Jewish Presence in German and Austrian Film, 1910-1933. Berghahn Books, 2005.

External links
  Website of the Feature Film directed by Anna Martinetz, 2013

1929 films
German drama films
German silent feature films
Films of the Weimar Republic
1929 drama films
Films directed by Paul Czinner
Films set in Vienna
Films based on Austrian novels
Films based on works by Arthur Schnitzler
Films with screenplays by Carl Mayer
Films with screenplays by Paul Czinner
Bavaria Film films
German black-and-white films
Silent drama films
1920s German films
1920s German-language films